Michel Krieger (born March 4, 1986) is a Brazilian-American entrepreneur and software engineer who co-founded Instagram along with Kevin Systrom, and served as its CTO. Instagram expanded from a few million users to 1 billion monthly active users while Krieger served as CTO.

On September 24, 2018, it was announced that Krieger and Systrom were resigning from Instagram.

Life and career
Krieger was born in São Paulo, Brazil, and moved to California in 2004 to attend Stanford University. At Stanford, where he studied symbolic systems, he met Kevin Systrom, and the two co-founded Instagram in 2010. Krieger and Systrom had the idea of building a check-in app, before they made it exclusive for pictures. During the early days, most of the engineering and user experience were developed solely by Krieger. One of the stories related to Instagram’s early days that Krieger recalled is:One time I woke up and there was an email saying that the site went down, and I was like, who fixed it? Shane, did you fix it? Kev, did you fix it? No. And eventually on the terminal, you press up and you get to see what was the last thing you typed. So, apparently, at 3:30 in the morning I somehow managed to, in a completely drunken state, revive Instagram. That’s how much we were struggling in those days.After Instagram was acquired by Facebook, Krieger was committed to building and growing Instagram independently.

On April 18, 2020, Krieger teamed up with Systrom again to launch Rt.live, their first product together since leaving Facebook. Rt.live is an up-to-date tracker of how fast COVID-19 is spreading in each US state.

Philanthropy
In April 2015, Krieger announced a partnership with charity evaluator GiveWell, committing US$750,000 over the next two years. The funds are to support operations, with 90% allocated to grants identified and recommended through the Open Philanthropy Project process.

In 2021, the Krieger's helped fund the opening of the Institute of Contemporary Art San Francisco (ICA SF) in Dogpatch, alongside funds from Pamela and David Hornik; and Deborah and Andy Rappaport.

Personal life
Krieger is married to Kaitlyn Trigger.

References

External links 
 CEO Secrets: Instagram boss on how to avoid 'burnout', BBC News 2015

1986 births
Brazilian emigrants to the United States
Brazilian engineers
Brazilian people of German descent
Computer programmers
Facebook employees
Living people
People from São Paulo
Stanford University alumni
Technology company founders